Brandywine Summit Camp Meeting is a historic camp meeting and national historic district located at Concord Township, Delaware County, Pennsylvania. The rural setting drew Methodists from nearby Wilmington, Delaware and West Chester. The district includes 76 contributing buildings near Chadds Ford village. The buildings are in a vernacular camp meeting style of architecture.  The centerpiece of the community are the Tabernacle, built about 1884, and Pavilion, also dated to the 1880s.  Most of the contributing buildings are cottages, built after the turn of the 20th century.

It was added to the National Register of Historic Places in 1995.

References

External links
 Brandywine Summit Camp Meeting website

Chautauqua
National Register of Historic Places in Delaware County, Pennsylvania
Buildings and structures in Delaware County, Pennsylvania
Historic districts on the National Register of Historic Places in Pennsylvania
Camp meeting grounds
Methodism in Pennsylvania